Ptychadena subpunctata is a species of frog in the family Ptychadenidae.
It is found in Angola, Botswana, Democratic Republic of the Congo, Namibia, Zambia, and Zimbabwe.
Its natural habitats are dry savanna, moist savanna, rivers, swamps, freshwater lakes, and freshwater marshes.

References 

Ptychadena
Taxonomy articles created by Polbot
Amphibians described in 1866